Put on Your Rosy Red Glasses is the debut studio album by American mathcore group the Number Twelve Looks Like You. It has been reissued twice since its original release by Brutal Records.
It has been regarded as the band’s heaviest release.

On June 12, 2015 the album was re-released on limited edition, hand numbered cassettes.

Writing concept
The lyrics of Put on Your Rosy Red Glasses are almost completely written in-perspective of well-known convicted murderer Albert Fish, although songs such as "If These Bullets Could Talk" and "Empty Calm" have no connection to the story of Fish.

The track "Document: Grace Budd" is a spoken excerpt of a letter written by Fish, detailing his murder of Grace Budd in 1934. At the end of the track, there is a quote from an episode of The Twilight Zone entitled "Mr. Denton on Doomsday", in which he sings: "How dry I am. Nobody knows how dry I am..." for a drink of alcohol.

Other information
The track "Civeta Dei" translates in English to "City of God".

The music on this release is much heavier than the band's later releases. The vocals on this album were done by using the fry scream technique among both Korman and Pedrick. There were neither edits nor enhancements on either of their voices.

Track listing 
All of the songs written and produced by The Number Twelve Looks Like You.

Personnel
The Number Twelve Looks Like You
Jesse Korman - vocals
Justin Pedrick - vocals
Alexis Pareja - guitar
Jamie Mcilroy - guitar
Michael Smagula - bass guitar
Christopher Conger - drums

Production and design
 Kurt Ballou - engineering, mastering, mixing, production
The Number Twelve Looks Like You - production

2003 debut albums
The Number Twelve Looks Like You albums
Albums produced by Kurt Ballou